Lieutenant-General Sir James Andrew Harcourt Gammell  (26 September 1892 – 1 September 1975) was a British Army officer who fought during both the First and the Second World Wars.

Early life and military career
Born in Edinburgh on 26 September 1892, the son of Sydney James and Alice Stobart, Gammell was educated at Winchester College, followed by the Pembroke College, Oxford, and was commissioned as a second lieutenant into the Scottish Horse in January 1913. He transferred to the Royal Field Artillery on 5 August 1914, the day after Britain entered the First World War. Gammell initially served with the 113th Battery of the 25th Brigade Royal Field Artillery, part of the 1st Division, and was sent to France on 20 August as part of the British Expeditionary Force (BEF). In March 1915, he was awarded the Military Cross (MC): the citation for the medal reads:

Later in the year fought in the Gallipoli campaign where he was twice mentioned in dispatches and, after this, he spent the rest of the war as a staff officer. He was posted to the HQ of the Egyptian Expeditionary Force (EEF), initially as a General Staff Officer Grade 3 (GSO3), later as GSO2 before returning to France in the summer of 1918 and, finally, being sent to England where he was GSO2 at the War Office. By the end of the war, Gammell was highly decorated; mentioned in dispatches seven times, twice awarded the MC, the first in 1915, and again in 1917, and gained the Distinguished Service Order (DSO) in 1918. The citation for his second MC reads:

Between the wars
Gammell remained in the army after the war, and was married in June 1919 to Gertrude Don. They had four children; James Gilbert Sydney, the eldest, born on 4 March 1920, John Frederick followed, born on 31 December 1921, Mary Finella, born on 15 April 1924, and Elizabeth Alice, the youngest, born on 22 April 1926.

He later attended the Staff College, Camberley from 1921 to 1922. After serving as a GSO2 with Aldershot Command in 1924, followed by a promotion to major and a transfer to the Queen's Own Cameron Highlanders in May 1927, he served with the 2nd Battalion, Camerons in Edinburgh, followed by a year with the 1st Battalion in Rangoon, Burma before returning to England and returning to the Staff College, Camberley, this time as a GSO2 with the rank of acting lieutenant-colonel, a position he held for five years, from 1930 to 1935.

In May 1935, he was promoted to lieutenant-colonel and appointed Commanding Officer (CO) of the 1st Battalion, Queen's Own Cameron Highlanders until 1938, when he attended the Imperial Defence College. Douglas Wimberley succeeded him in command of the battalion. This was followed by a promotion to the temporary rank of brigadier in December 1938, and he assumed command of the 4th Infantry Brigade, part of the 2nd Infantry Division.

Second World War
Shortly after the outbreak of the Second World War in September 1939, Gammell, along with his brigade, was deployed to France towards the end of the month, where it became part of the British Expeditionary Force (BEF). Unlike in the First World War, where there was almost immediate action, the first few months of the Second World War where for the Western Allies relatively quiet, and no major actions took place leading to this period of time becoming known as the "Phoney War". After his brigade spent the first few months of the war digging defensive positions in expectation of a repeat of the trench warfare of 1914–1918, in February 1940 Gammell returned to England where he was given a new role as Chief of Staff of the newly created IV Corps, then commanded by Lieutenant-General Claude Auchinleck, who noted that Gammell "worked like a slave" and that his "energy, determination and devotion to duty were remarkable", and then of Allied Forces Norway during the ill-fated Norwegian Campaign later that year.

In late June 1940, returning again to England, Gammell was given command of the 15th Infantry Brigade. The brigade had recently fought in Norway were it had sustained nearly 800 casualties and was evacuated to Scotland in early May. Gammell's brigade came under the 5th Infantry Division in early July. Along with the division, Gammell and his brigade commenced anti-invasion duties and concentrated on reforming and being brought up to strength again.

He was only to remain with the brigade for four weeks, as was prompted to major-general in July, and became GOC 3rd Infantry Division. His new command was stationed in Southern England and had recently fought in France. Gammell's division was assigned to the GHQ Home Forces reserve, and held in readiness in a counterattack role in the event of a German invasion. Gammell continued his command and counterattack role through to November 1941. In late November 1941, Gammell was promoted and took command of XII Corps with the acting rank of lieutenant-general. His corps was tasked with the defence of southern England, although the threat of invasion had receded. He also began training for offensive operations overseas, which included Exercise Tiger in May 1942.

In September 1942, Gammell took over Eastern Command. For the rest of the year and throughout 1943, several large-scale exercises took place. This included Exercise Spartan, the largest military exercise ever held in the United Kingdom, in March, where Gammell's command played the role of the "German Sixth Army" against Lieutenant-General Andrew McNaughton's First Canadian Army, which in turn was played the role of the British Second Army.

In early January 1944, Gammell was appointed Chief of Staff to the Supreme Allied Commander Mediterranean, General Sir Henry Maitland Wilson. This command oversaw all operations in the Mediterranean theatre, in particular on the Italian Front.

Postwar
After the war he became Head of the British Military Mission to Moscow and retired from the army in May 1946.

He lived at Alrick in Glenisla. He was Deputy lieutenant for Angus and, after the death of his first wife, Gertrude (or "G" as he called her), in 1960, he was remarried four years later to Mary Kirkwood, daughter of a Royal Navy officer. Gammell himself died on 1 September 1975, just a few weeks short of his 83rd birthday, and was cremated, with his ashes buried at Alrick.

References

Bibliography

External links
British  Army Officers 1939−1945
Biography of Lieutenant General Sir James Gammell
Generals of World War II

|-

|-
 

1892 births
1975 deaths
British Army generals of World War II
British Army personnel of World War I
Companions of the Distinguished Service Order
Knights Commander of the Order of the Bath
Queen's Own Cameron Highlanders officers
Recipients of the Military Cross
Royal Field Artillery officers
Scottish Horse officers
Graduates of the Staff College, Camberley
Graduates of the Royal College of Defence Studies
People educated at Winchester College
Alumni of Pembroke College, Oxford
Military personnel from Edinburgh
Academics of the Staff College, Camberley
Deputy Lieutenants of Angus
British Army lieutenant generals